A priori (Latin, 'from the earlier') is a term used in philosophy and epistemology. 

A priori or apriori may also refer to:

 A priori language, a type of constructed language
 A priori estimate, in the theory of partial differential equations
 A priori probability, a probability derived by deductive reasoning
 Apriori algorithm, an algorithm used with databases
 aPriori Capital Partners, a private equity investment firm 
 Apriori Control (Apriori, LLC), later Reach-In, a technology company

See also

 A posteriori (disambiguation)
 Priory, a monastery headed by a prior or prioress
 Ex-ante, a Latin phrase meaning 'before the event'